Zhao Xia (born July 28, 1988) is a Chinese-American professional wrestler. She is currently signed to WWE, where she performs on the SmackDown brand under the ring name Xia Li.

Professional wrestling career

WWE

Mae Young Classic (2017–2018) 
In January 2017, Li joined the WWE Performance Center after she had impressed talent scouts at a tryout in Shanghai, China. On July 13, she made her debut for WWE competing in the inaugural Mae Young Classic, making her the first Chinese woman to ever compete in a WWE ring. She was eliminated in the first round by Mercedes Martinez. On September 19, 2018, Li competed in her second Mae Young Classic, defeating Karen Q in the first round, but was eliminated in the second round by Deonna Purrazzo. Throughout 2017 and 2018, Li only wrestled at NXT live events outside of the Mae Young Classic.

Beginnings in NXT (2019−2020) 
On January 27, 2019, at the Royal Rumble, Li made her first appearance on a main roster pay-per-view by entering the women's Royal Rumble match at number 11, lasting 4:48 before being eliminated by Charlotte Flair. She made her television debut on the February 20 episode of NXT, losing in a singles match to Mia Yim. On the May 1 episode of NXT, she picked up her first televised win by defeating Rachel Evers. In mid-November, Li got into a feud with Aliyah and Vanessa Borne, getting singles victories over the duo on the November 13 and 27 episodes of NXT respectively, the latter of which saw her get attacked by NXT Women's Champion Shayna Baszler, Marina Shafir and Jessamyn Duke afterwards. It led to a non-title match the following week, with Li losing to Baszler by submission.

Li would compete in the women's Royal Rumble match again at the namesake event on January 26, 2020, entering at number 24 and lasting 10:49, before being eliminated by Shayna Baszler. Li fought with Mia Yim again on the February 26 episode of NXT, this time winning the match with a roll-up after a distraction from Dakota Kai and Raquel González. On the March 25 episode of NXT, Li was set to face Aliyah in a qualifier to compete in a Ladder match to determine the number one contender for the NXT Women's Championship, but was injured by her backstage before the match started. This led to a brief match between the two on the April 15 episode of NXT, with Li getting revenge by defeating Aliyah. On the May 6 episode of NXT, Li had a match with Chelsea Green, which she lost due to a distraction from Aliyah. This led to another match between the two on the June 17 episode of NXT, with Aliyah getting the victory after Robert Stone distracted Li by vomiting in the ring.

Tian Sha (2020−2021) 
On the September 16 episode of NXT, Li teamed up with Jessi Kamea in a losing effort against Kayden Carter and Kacy Catanzaro, with Li refusing to shake hands with them after the match. The following week, she competed in a battle royal to determine the number one contender for the NXT Women's Championship, which was won by Candice LeRae. Li went against Carter on the September 30 episode of NXT, losing the match and pushing her to the mat after being extended a hand. The following week, after losing a match against Shotzi Blackheart, she was approached by Boa who gave her a letter and followed him afterwards. On the October 21 episode of NXT, Li lost a match against Catanzaro. After the match, she attacked her and Carter, thus turning heel.

On the November 25 episode of NXT, a vignette aired of Li and fellow NXT superstar Boa, both haggard in appearance, entering the backseat of a vehicle together before being driven to an unknown location. The same elderly man who handed Boa a letter on the November 11 episode of NXT appeared outside of the building, appearing to be waiting for them. Weekly vignettes began airing of both Li and Boa being brutally "punished for their failures", all while being watched over by the elderly man and a mysterious woman in black-and-white face paint. A transformed Li returned on January 6, 2021 during NXT's New Year's Evil special, squashing Katrina Cortez in dominant fashion. The following week, she defeated another jobber in two strikes, but then was wordlessly given an order by her master on the stage, resulting in Li tying up the opponent and taking more shots at her. On the February 10 episode of NXT, Li defeated Cora Jade in quick fashion. During and after the match, Kacy Catanzaro and Kayden Carter came out to the ring to reason with her but she attacked them both for disrespecting her master Mei Ying. Li went on to defeat both Catanzaro and Carter in singles bouts on the February 24 and March 10 episodes of NXT respectively, and beat them again in a handicap match three weeks later.

In June, Li began a feud with Mercedes Martinez over losing to her in the inaugural Mae Young Classic, defeating her in a match at NXT TakeOver: In Your House. On the June 29 episode of NXT, she teamed with Boa to defeat Martinez and Jake Atlas in a mixed tag team match. On the July 20 episode of NXT, Li challenged Raquel González for the NXT Women's Championship but failed to win. During the match, she suffered an injury following a springboard senton splash however, she appeared to be okay afterwards.

SmackDown (2021–present) 
As part of the 2021 Draft, Li was drafted to the SmackDown brand. She made her main roster debut on the December 10 episode of SmackDown as a face, protecting Naomi as she fought off Sonya Deville, Natalya, and Shayna Baszler. On the February 25, 2022 episode of SmackDown, Li made her in-ring debut by defeating Natalya. After weeks of inactivity, Li turned heel in a segment on the April 22 episode of SmackDown, stating that no one was worthy of protecting and that she was only focused on protecting herself. On the June 3 episode of SmackDown, Li competed in a six-pack challenge to determine the number one contender to the SmackDown Women's Championship, which was won by Natalya. The following week, she failed to qualify for the Women's Money in the Bank ladder match after losing to Lacey Evans. Li made her debut on the Raw brand on the June 27 episode, competing in a Last Chance six-way elimination match to qualify for the Women's Money in the Bank ladder match, but was eliminated first by Becky Lynch.

On the August 5 episode of SmackDown, Li competed in a gauntlet match to determine the number one contender to Liv Morgan's SmackDown Women's Championship, which was won by Baszler. The following week, she teamed with Shotzi to participate in the WWE Women's Tag Team Championship Tournament for the vacant tag titles, but were eliminated by Raquel Rodriguez and Aliyah. On the August 26 episode of SmackDown, Li teamed with Shotzi again to compete in a "Last Chance" Fatal 4-Way to be in the semifinal match of the WWE Women's Tag Team Championship Tournament later that night, which was won by Natalya and Sonya Deville. On the September 9 episode of SmackDown, she competed in a five-way elimination match to determine the number one contender to Morgan's SmackDown Women's Championship at Extreme Rules, which was won by Ronda Rousey. On the November 11 episode of SmackDown, Li competed in a six-pack challenge to determine the number one contender to Rousey's SmackDown Women's Championship at Survivor Series WarGames, which was won by Shotzi. On the December 23 episode of SmackDown, Li competed in a gauntlet match to determine the number one contender to Rousey's SmackDown Women's Championship, eliminating Emma and Tegan Nox but was eliminated by eventual winner Rodriguez.

At Royal Rumble on January 28, 2023, Li entered at number 14, lasting 15 minutes and 30 seconds before she was eliminated by Zelina Vega.

Other media 
Li made her video game debut in The Whole Dam Pack DLC for WWE 2K22.

Personal life 
Before joining WWE, Li was a lifelong combat-sports athlete, competing in the martial art of wushu. She was the co-founder of her own fitness studio and achieved multiple first place finishes in various martial arts and fitness competitions including: the second World Traditional Chinese Wushu Championship, Nike Challenge Competition and first China Throw Down: Battle on the Bund.

Championships and accomplishments
 Pro Wrestling Illustrated
 Ranked No. 122 of the top 150 female wrestlers in the PWI Women's 150 in 2021

References

External links 
 
 
 

1988 births
Living people
Sportspeople from Chongqing
Chinese wushu practitioners
Chinese female professional wrestlers
21st-century professional wrestlers